Reyhaneh Khatouni (born 12 May 1993) is an Iranian racing cyclist. In 2015, she won both the Iranian National Road Race Championships and the Iranian National Time Trial Championships.

See also
 2015 national road cycling championships

References

External links

1993 births
Living people
Iranian female cyclists
Place of birth missing (living people)
20th-century Iranian women
21st-century Iranian women